Wendy Thompson (born 26 January 1946) is a Canadian speed skater. She competed in two events at the 1968 Winter Olympics.

References

1946 births
Living people
Canadian female speed skaters
Olympic speed skaters of Canada
Speed skaters at the 1968 Winter Olympics
Speed skaters from Winnipeg